The Gibbs Aquada is a high speed amphibious vehicle developed by Gibbs Sports Amphibians. Rather than adding wheels to a boat design, or creating a car that floats, the Aquada was designed from the ground up to perform very well in both fields, with over 60 patents covering technical innovations.

The Gibbs Aquada was a limited production concept car produced in 2003 and 2004.

The Gibbs Aquada is powered by a 2.5L Rover V6 engine.

In 2004 Richard Branson, owner of the Virgin Group, used a Gibbs Aquada to set a new record for crossing the English Channel in an amphibious vehicle. Branson cut 4 hours 20 minutes off the previous record of 6 hours, which had stood since the late 1960s. The officially recorded time was 1 hour 40 minutes, 6 seconds.

For the August 2004 edition of Top Gear magazine, journalist Paul Walton drove an Aquada into and around the Monaco harbour during the Grand Prix of Monaco to watch the event for free. He found the Aquada fast and responsive both in and out of the water but was too slow to see any of the race.

The Aquada was developed in Auckland, New Zealand.
The successors to the Aquada are the Gibbs Humdinga and the Gibbs Quadski.

See also
 Amphicar (1961)
 Gibbs Humdinga (2006)
 Gibbs Quadski (2006)
 WaterCar
 Rinspeed sQuba
 List of car manufacturers of the United Kingdom

References

External links
 Gibbs Technologies official website
 website of Paul Walton who drove the Aquada for Top Gear magazine

Wheeled amphibious vehicles